Guilherme Costa may refer to:

 Guilherme Posser da Costa (born 1953), former Prime Minister of São Tomé and Príncipe
 Guilherme Costa (footballer) (born 1994), Brazilian football attacking midfielder
 Guilherme Costa (swimmer) (born 1998), Brazilian swimmer

See also
 Guilherme (footballer, born May 1991), Guilherme Costa Marques, Brazilian football midfielder